The 1916 Pittsburgh Pirates season was the 35th season of the Pittsburgh Pirates franchise; the 30th in the National League. In April 1916, newspapers reported that Otto Knabe would join the team at second base at the end of the month.

The Pirates finished sixth in the league standings with a record of 65–89.

Regular season

Season standings

Record vs. opponents

Game log

|- bgcolor="ffbbbb"
| 1 || April 12 || @ Cardinals || 1–2 || Doak || Kantlehner (0–1) || — || — || 0–1
|- bgcolor="ccffcc"
| 2 || April 13 || @ Cardinals || 4–0 || Adams (1–0) || Meadows || — || — || 1–1
|- bgcolor="ffbbbb"
| 3 || April 14 || @ Cardinals || 3–5 || Jasper || Harmon (0–1) || Griner || — || 1–2
|- bgcolor="ccffcc"
| 4 || April 15 || @ Cardinals || 6–1 || Mamaux (1–0) || Hall || — || — || 2–2
|- bgcolor="ffbbbb"
| 5 || April 16 || @ Reds || 1–6 || Toney || Miller (0–1) || — || — || 2–3
|- bgcolor="ccffcc"
| 6 || April 17 || @ Reds || 10–1 || Kantlehner (1–1) || Dale || — || — || 3–3
|- bgcolor="ffbbbb"
| 7 || April 18 || @ Reds || 3–4 (10) || Schneider || Adams (1–1) || — || — || 3–4
|- bgcolor="ffbbbb"
| 8 || April 20 || Cardinals || 0–5 || Meadows || Mamaux (1–1) || Sallee || — || 3–5
|- bgcolor="ccffcc"
| 9 || April 21 || Cardinals || 8–0 || Harmon (1–1) || Steele || — || — || 4–5
|- bgcolor="ffbbbb"
| 10 || April 23 || @ Cubs || 0–3 || McConnell || Kantlehner (1–2) || — || 16,000 || 4–6
|- bgcolor="ffbbbb"
| 11 || April 26 || @ Cubs || 3–6 || Lavender || Adams (1–2) || Prendergast || — || 4–7
|- bgcolor="ccffcc"
| 12 || April 28 || Reds || 5–1 || Harmon (2–1) || Schneider || — || — || 5–7
|- bgcolor="ccffcc"
| 13 || April 29 || Reds || 2–1 || Mamaux (2–1) || Toney || Miller (1) || — || 6–7
|- bgcolor="ffbbbb"
| 14 || April 30 || @ Reds || 7–8 || Schneider || Harmon (2–2) || — || — || 6–8
|-

|- bgcolor="ffbbbb"
| 15 || May 1 || @ Reds || 0–3 || Mitchell || Adams (1–3) || — || — || 6–9
|- bgcolor="ccffcc"
| 16 || May 4 || Cubs || 4–2 || Cooper (1–0) || Lavender || — || 4,000 || 7–9
|- bgcolor="ffbbbb"
| 17 || May 5 || Cubs || 3–5 (13) || Seaton || Kantlehner (1–3) || — || — || 7–10
|- bgcolor="ffbbbb"
| 18 || May 6 || Cubs || 1–2 || Vaughn || Adams (1–4) || — || 8,000 || 7–11
|- bgcolor="ccffcc"
| 19 || May 7 || @ Cubs || 1–0 || Kantlehner (2–3) || Lavender || — || 19,000 || 8–11
|- bgcolor="ffbbbb"
| 20 || May 8 || @ Cubs || 1–2 || McConnell || Cooper (1–1) || — || — || 8–12
|- bgcolor="ccffcc"
| 21 || May 8 || @ Cubs || 6–4 || Mamaux (3–1) || Packard || — || — || 9–12
|- bgcolor="ffbbbb"
| 22 || May 9 || Giants || 5–13 || Tesreau || Harmon (2–3) || Mathewson || — || 9–13
|- bgcolor="ffbbbb"
| 23 || May 10 || Giants || 1–7 || Anderson || Adams (1–5) || — || 2,000 || 9–14
|- bgcolor="ffbbbb"
| 24 || May 11 || Giants || 2–3 || Perritt || Kantlehner (2–4) || Stroud || 2,000 || 9–15
|- bgcolor="ffbbbb"
| 25 || May 12 || Giants || 2–3 (10) || Schauer || Mamaux (3–2) || — || 2,000 || 9–16
|- bgcolor="ccffcc"
| 26 || May 13 || Braves || 5–3 || Adams (2–5) || Reulbach || Kantlehner (1) || — || 10–16
|- bgcolor="ccffcc"
| 27 || May 15 || Braves || 8–7 || Harmon (3–3) || Rudolph || Mamaux (1) || — || 11–16
|- bgcolor="ffbbbb"
| 28 || May 18 || Phillies || 0–3 || Alexander || Kantlehner (2–5) || — || — || 11–17
|- bgcolor="ccffcc"
| 29 || May 19 || Phillies || 4–2 || Mamaux (4–2) || McQuillan || — || — || 12–17
|- bgcolor="ffbbbb"
| 30 || May 20 || Phillies || 1–5 || Demaree || Adams (2–6) || — || — || 12–18
|- bgcolor="ffbbbb"
| 31 || May 23 || Robins || 0–6 || Pfeffer || Kantlehner (2–6) || — || — || 12–19
|- bgcolor="ffbbbb"
| 32 || May 24 || Robins || 2–3 (10) || Cheney || Harmon (3–4) || — || — || 12–20
|- bgcolor="ccffcc"
| 33 || May 25 || Robins || 5–0 || Miller (1–1) || Dell || — || — || 13–20
|- bgcolor="ccffcc"
| 34 || May 26 || @ Cardinals || 6–5 (11) || Mamaux (5–2) || Sallee || — || 2,000 || 14–20
|- bgcolor="ccffcc"
| 35 || May 28 || @ Cardinals || 4–0 || Cooper (2–1) || Doak || — || — || 15–20
|- bgcolor="ccffcc"
| 36 || May 28 || @ Cardinals || 4–1 (5) || Mamaux (6–2) || Meadows || — || — || 16–20
|- bgcolor="ffbbbb"
| 37 || May 29 || Reds || 1–6 || Mitchell || Jacobs (0–1) || — || — || 16–21
|- bgcolor="ccffcc"
| 38 || May 30 || Reds || 9–8 || Cooper (3–1) || Schulz || — || — || 17–21
|- bgcolor="ffbbbb"
| 39 || May 31 || Reds || 2–5 (16) || Toney || Miller (1–2) || — || — || 17–22
|-

|- bgcolor="ccffcc"
| 40 || June 1 || Reds || 8–4 || Harmon (4–4) || Schneider || — || — || 18–22
|- bgcolor="ccffcc"
| 41 || June 2 || @ Robins || 5–2 || Mamaux (7–2) || Appleton || — || — || 19–22
|- bgcolor="ffbbbb"
| 42 || June 5 || @ Robins || 2–3 || Dell || Miller (1–3) || — || 2,500 || 19–23
|- bgcolor="ccffcc"
| 43 || June 6 || @ Giants || 3–2 || Mamaux (8–2) || Benton || — || 9,000 || 20–23
|- bgcolor="ffbbbb"
| 44 || June 12 || @ Phillies || 1–2 || Alexander || Mamaux (8–3) || — || — || 20–24
|- bgcolor="ffbbbb"
| 45 || June 13 || @ Phillies || 3–5 || Bender || Adams (2–7) || — || 4,000 || 20–25
|- bgcolor="ffbbbb"
| 46 || June 14 || @ Phillies || 2–3 (12) || Rixey || Jacobs (0–2) || — || — || 20–26
|- bgcolor="ccffcc"
| 47 || June 15 || @ Braves || 2–1 || Mamaux (9–3) || Reulbach || — || — || 21–26
|- bgcolor="ffbbbb"
| 48 || June 16 || @ Braves || 0–2 || Hughes || Kantlehner (2–7) || — || — || 21–27
|- bgcolor="ffbbbb"
| 49 || June 20 || Cardinals || 6–10 (12) || Jasper || Miller (1–4) || Williams || — || 21–28
|- bgcolor="ccffcc"
| 50 || June 22 || Cardinals || 8–4 || Jacobs (1–2) || Williams || — || — || 22–28
|- bgcolor="ffbbbb"
| 51 || June 23 || Cardinals || 7–8 || Jasper || Harmon (4–5) || Ames || — || 22–29
|- bgcolor="ccffcc"
| 52 || June 24 || Cardinals || 4–3 || Mamaux (10–3) || Steele || — || — || 23–29
|- bgcolor="ccffcc"
| 53 || June 24 || Cardinals || 5–2 || Miller (2–4) || Hall || — || — || 24–29
|- bgcolor="ccffcc"
| 54 || June 25 || @ Cubs || 8–3 (12) || Cooper (4–1) || Vaughn || — || — || 25–29
|- bgcolor="ffbbbb"
| 55 || June 27 || @ Cubs || 0–1 || Prendergast || Cooper (4–2) || — || — || 25–30
|- bgcolor="ffbbbb"
| 56 || June 27 || @ Cubs || 4–10 || Seaton || Adams (2–8) || Prendergast || — || 25–31
|- bgcolor="ccffcc"
| 57 || June 28 || @ Cubs || 3–2 || Mamaux (11–3) || Lavender || — || — || 26–31
|- bgcolor="ccffcc"
| 58 || June 28 || @ Cubs || 3–2 (18) || Cooper (5–2) || McConnell || — || — || 27–31
|- bgcolor="ccffcc"
| 59 || June 30 || @ Reds || 3–2 || Harmon (5–5) || Schneider || — || — || 28–31
|-

|- bgcolor="ccffcc"
| 60 || July 1 || @ Reds || 2–1 || Mamaux (12–3) || Knetzer || — || — || 29–31
|- bgcolor="ffbbbb"
| 61 || July 2 || @ Reds || 2–3 || Toney || Miller (2–5) || — || — || 29–32
|- bgcolor="ccffcc"
| 62 || July 2 || @ Reds || 6–1 (5) || Kantlehner (3–7) || Dale || — || 6,000 || 30–32
|- bgcolor="ffbbbb"
| 63 || July 3 || Cubs || 2–3 || Seaton || Cooper (5–3) || Packard || — || 30–33
|- bgcolor="ffbbbb"
| 64 || July 4 || Cubs || 0–5 || Vaughn || Kantlehner (3–8) || — || — || 30–34
|- bgcolor="ccffcc"
| 65 || July 4 || Cubs || 1–0 || Mamaux (13–3) || Prendergast || — || — || 31–34
|- bgcolor="ffbbbb"
| 66 || July 5 || Cubs || 3–4 || Hendrix || Miller (2–6) || Lavender || — || 31–35
|- bgcolor="ffbbbb"
| 67 || July 6 || Giants || 6–12 || Perritt || Cooper (5–4) || — || — || 31–36
|- bgcolor="ccffcc"
| 68 || July 7 || Giants || 5–2 || Jacobs (2–2) || Anderson || — || — || 32–36
|- bgcolor="ffbbbb"
| 69 || July 8 || Giants || 4–6 || Benton || Mamaux (13–4) || — || — || 32–37
|- bgcolor="ccffcc"
| 70 || July 10 || Giants || 7–1 || Miller (3–6) || Schauer || — || — || 33–37
|- bgcolor="ccffcc"
| 71 || July 11 || Braves || 3–2 || Jacobs (3–2) || Barnes || — || — || 34–37
|- bgcolor="ffbbbb"
| 72 || July 12 || Braves || 5–6 || Barnes || Mamaux (13–5) || Hughes || — || 34–38
|- bgcolor="ffbbbb"
| 73 || July 14 || Braves || 0–3 || Ragan || Harmon (5–6) || — || 2,500 || 34–39
|- bgcolor="ffbbbb"
| 74 || July 15 || Phillies || 0–4 || Alexander || Jacobs (3–3) || — || — || 34–40
|- bgcolor="ccffcc"
| 75 || July 15 || Phillies || 7–5 || Mamaux (14–5) || Chalmers || Kantlehner (2) || — || 35–40
|- bgcolor="ccffcc"
| 76 || July 19 || Robins || 1–0 || Kantlehner (4–8) || Pfeffer || — || — || 36–40
|- bgcolor="ccffcc"
| 77 || July 19 || Robins || 2–1 (14) || Miller (4–6) || Smith || — || — || 37–40
|- bgcolor="ffbbbb"
| 78 || July 22 || Robins || 1–7 || Pfeffer || Kantlehner (4–9) || — || — || 37–41
|- bgcolor="ffbbbb"
| 79 || July 22 || Robins || 2–3 (15) || Marquard || Miller (4–7) || — || — || 37–42
|- bgcolor="ccffcc"
| 80 || July 24 || Phillies || 9–1 || Mamaux (15–5) || Demaree || — || — || 38–42
|- bgcolor="ffbbbb"
| 81 || July 26 || @ Phillies || 1–7 || Alexander || Adams (2–9) || — || — || 38–43
|- bgcolor="ccffcc"
| 82 || July 26 || @ Phillies || 5–2 || Miller (5–7) || Rixey || — || 12,000 || 39–43
|- bgcolor="ffbbbb"
| 83 || July 27 || @ Phillies || 4–5 || Chalmers || Harmon (5–7) || — || 3,500 || 39–44
|- bgcolor="ffbbbb"
| 84 || July 28 || @ Phillies || 2–5 || Bender || Jacobs (3–4) || — || 4,500 || 39–45
|- bgcolor="ffbbbb"
| 85 || July 29 || @ Giants || 3–4 (11) || Perritt || Mamaux (15–6) || — || — || 39–46
|- bgcolor="ffbbbb"
| 86 || July 29 || @ Giants || 0–5 || Anderson || Kantlehner (4–10) || — || 25,000 || 39–47
|- bgcolor="ffbbbb"
| 87 || July 31 || @ Giants || 0–7 || Sallee || Miller (5–8) || — || — || 39–48
|- bgcolor="ffbbbb"
| 88 || July 31 || @ Giants || 0–7 || Tesreau || Jacobs (3–5) || — || — || 39–49
|-

|- bgcolor="ccffcc"
| 89 || August 1 || @ Giants || 4–3 (10) || Cooper (6–4) || Schupp || — || 5,000 || 40–49
|- bgcolor="ffbbbb"
| 90 || August 2 || @ Giants || 2–6 || Benton || Mamaux (15–7) || — || — || 40–50
|- bgcolor="ffbbbb"
| 91 || August 3 || @ Robins || 2–7 || Cheney || Miller (5–9) || — || 2,500 || 40–51
|- bgcolor="ffbbbb"
| 92 || August 4 || @ Robins || 0–2 || Smith || Harmon (5–8) || — || — || 40–52
|- bgcolor="ffbbbb"
| 93 || August 5 || @ Robins || 0–4 || Marquard || Cooper (6–5) || — || — || 40–53
|- bgcolor="ccffcc"
| 94 || August 5 || @ Robins || 7–1 || Mamaux (16–7) || Pfeffer || — || — || 41–53
|- bgcolor="ccffcc"
| 95 || August 11 || @ Braves || 2–1 || Miller (6–9) || Barnes || — || — || 42–53
|- bgcolor="ffbbbb"
| 96 || August 11 || @ Braves || 1–4 || Tyler || Mamaux (16–8) || — || 10,000 || 42–54
|- bgcolor="ccffcc"
| 97 || August 12 || Cubs || 3–0 || Cooper (7–5) || Lavender || — || — || 43–54
|- bgcolor="ffbbbb"
| 98 || August 13 || @ Cardinals || 8–9 (11) || Ames || Kantlehner (4–11) || — || — || 43–55
|- bgcolor="ccffcc"
| 99 || August 13 || @ Cardinals || 9–5 (5) || Mamaux (17–8) || Watson || — || — || 44–55
|- bgcolor="ccffcc"
| 100 || August 15 || @ Cardinals || 1–0 || Harmon (6–8) || Meadows || — || — || 45–55
|- bgcolor="ccffcc"
| 101 || August 15 || @ Cardinals || 2–1 || Cooper (8–5) || Ames || — || — || 46–55
|- bgcolor="ffbbbb"
| 102 || August 17 || Robins || 1–5 || Pfeffer || Mamaux (17–9) || — || — || 46–56
|- bgcolor="ffbbbb"
| 103 || August 18 || Robins || 0–6 || Cheney || Harmon (6–9) || — || — || 46–57
|- bgcolor="ccffcc"
| 104 || August 19 || Robins || 2–1 (10) || Cooper (9–5) || Smith || — || — || 47–57
|- bgcolor="ffbbbb"
| 105 || August 19 || Robins || 0–1 || Marquard || Kantlehner (4–12) || — || — || 47–58
|- bgcolor="ccffcc"
| 106 || August 21 || Phillies || 6–3 || Jacobs (4–5) || Alexander || — || — || 48–58
|- bgcolor="ccffcc"
| 107 || August 21 || Phillies || 2–1 || Evans (1–0) || Demaree || — || — || 49–58
|- bgcolor="ffbbbb"
| 108 || August 22 || Phillies || 2–6 || Mayer || Harmon (6–10) || McQuillan || — || 49–59
|- bgcolor="ccffcc"
| 109 || August 22 || Phillies || 9–7 || Cooper (10–5) || Bender || — || — || 50–59
|- bgcolor="ccffcc"
| 110 || August 23 || Phillies || 2–1 (16) || Evans (2–0) || Rixey || — || 1,000 || 51–59
|- bgcolor="ccffcc"
| 111 || August 24 || Giants || 10–1 || Jacobs (5–5) || Tesreau || — || — || 52–59
|- bgcolor="ffbbbb"
| 112 || August 25 || Giants || 2–6 (11) || Tesreau || Harmon (6–11) || — || 3,000 || 52–60
|- bgcolor="ffffff"
| 113 || August 26 || Giants || 1–1 (14) ||  ||  || — || — || 52–60
|- bgcolor="ccffcc"
| 114 || August 28 || Braves || 5–1 || Mamaux (18–9) || Rudolph || — || — || 53–60
|- bgcolor="ffbbbb"
| 115 || August 28 || Braves || 2–8 (7) || Allen || Kantlehner (4–13) || — || 5,000 || 53–61
|- bgcolor="ffbbbb"
| 116 || August 29 || Braves || 1–6 || Tyler || Jacobs (5–6) || — || — || 53–62
|- bgcolor="ffbbbb"
| 117 || August 29 || Braves || 5–9 || Hughes || Kantlehner (4–14) || — || 7,000 || 53–63
|- bgcolor="ffbbbb"
| 118 || August 30 || Braves || 0–1 || Rudolph || Cooper (10–6) || — || — || 53–64
|- bgcolor="ccffcc"
| 119 || August 30 || Braves || 7–6 || Jacobs (6–6) || Allen || Cooper (1) || 5,000 || 54–64
|- bgcolor="ccffcc"
| 120 || August 31 || Braves || 3–2 (8) || Mamaux (19–9) || Nehf || — || 2,000 || 55–64
|-

|- bgcolor="ffbbbb"
| 121 || September 1 || Reds || 3–6 || Toney || Jacobs (6–7) || — || — || 55–65
|- bgcolor="ccffcc"
| 122 || September 2 || Reds || 4–3 || Harmon (7–11) || Knetzer || — || — || 56–65
|- bgcolor="ffbbbb"
| 123 || September 2 || Reds || 2–7 || Moseley || Evans (2–1) || Schulz || 10,000 || 56–66
|- bgcolor="ffbbbb"
| 124 || September 3 || @ Reds || 6–7 || Mitchell || Mamaux (19–10) || — || — || 56–67
|- bgcolor="ccffcc"
| 125 || September 4 || Cardinals || 7–0 || Miller (7–9) || Meadows || — || 5,000 || 57–67
|- bgcolor="ccffcc"
| 126 || September 4 || Cardinals || 2–0 || Cooper (11–6) || Watson || — || 12,000 || 58–67
|- bgcolor="ccffcc"
| 127 || September 6 || Cardinals || 3–2 || Kantlehner (5–14) || Steele || — || — || 59–67
|- bgcolor="ccffcc"
| 128 || September 6 || Cardinals || 6–3 || Harmon (8–11) || Ames || — || 3,500 || 60–67
|- bgcolor="ccffcc"
| 129 || September 7 || Cubs || 5–4 || Mamaux (20–10) || Packard || Cooper (2) || — || 61–67
|- bgcolor="ffbbbb"
| 130 || September 9 || Cubs || 0–3 || Vaughn || Kantlehner (5–15) || — || — || 61–68
|- bgcolor="ffbbbb"
| 131 || September 9 || Cubs || 0–2 || Lavender || Cooper (11–7) || — || 12,000 || 61–69
|- bgcolor="ccffcc"
| 132 || September 10 || @ Cubs || 8–7 || Grimes (1–0) || Prendergast || Mamaux (2) || — || 62–69
|- bgcolor="ffbbbb"
| 133 || September 12 || @ Robins || 0–6 || Pfeffer || Evans (2–2) || — || — || 62–70
|- bgcolor="ccffcc"
| 134 || September 12 || @ Robins || 2–1 || Mamaux (21–10) || Coombs || — || 10,000 || 63–70
|- bgcolor="ccffcc"
| 135 || September 13 || @ Robins || 6–3 || Cooper (12–7) || Smith || — || — || 64–70
|- bgcolor="ffbbbb"
| 136 || September 14 || @ Robins || 2–3 || Cheney || Grimes (1–1) || — || — || 64–71
|- bgcolor="ffbbbb"
| 137 || September 15 || @ Robins || 1–8 (5) || Marquard || Jacobs (6–8) || — || — || 64–72
|- bgcolor="ffbbbb"
| 138 || September 16 || @ Giants || 2–8 || Benton || Mamaux (21–11) || — || — || 64–73
|- bgcolor="ffbbbb"
| 139 || September 16 || @ Giants || 3–4 || Tesreau || Cooper (12–8) || — || — || 64–74
|- bgcolor="ffbbbb"
| 140 || September 18 || @ Giants || 0–2 || Schupp || Miller (7–10) || — || — || 64–75
|- bgcolor="ffffff"
| 141 || September 18 || @ Giants || 1–1 (8) ||  ||  || — || — || 64–75
|- bgcolor="ffbbbb"
| 142 || September 19 || @ Giants || 2–9 || Benton || Jacobs (6–9) || — || — || 64–76
|- bgcolor="ffbbbb"
| 143 || September 19 || @ Giants || 1–5 || Tesreau || Evans (2–3) || — || — || 64–77
|- bgcolor="ffbbbb"
| 144 || September 20 || @ Phillies || 0–7 || Demaree || Cooper (12–9) || — || — || 64–78
|- bgcolor="ffbbbb"
| 145 || September 20 || @ Phillies || 2–3 || Demaree || Mamaux (21–12) || — || — || 64–79
|- bgcolor="ccffcc"
| 146 || September 21 || @ Phillies || 8–3 || Grimes (2–1) || Rixey || — || — || 65–79
|- bgcolor="ffbbbb"
| 147 || September 22 || @ Phillies || 4–7 || Mayer || Evans (2–4) || — || — || 65–80
|- bgcolor="ffbbbb"
| 148 || September 23 || @ Braves || 2–4 || Rudolph || Mamaux (21–13) || — || — || 65–81
|- bgcolor="ffffff"
| 149 || September 23 || @ Braves || 1–1 (13) ||  ||  || — || — || 65–81
|- bgcolor="ffbbbb"
| 150 || September 25 || @ Braves || 0–5 || Tyler || Grimes (2–2) || — || — || 65–82
|- bgcolor="ffbbbb"
| 151 || September 25 || @ Braves || 2–3 || Reulbach || Mamaux (21–14) || — || — || 65–83
|- bgcolor="ffbbbb"
| 152 || September 26 || @ Braves || 0–3 || Nehf || Evans (2–5) || — || — || 65–84
|- bgcolor="ffbbbb"
| 153 || September 26 || @ Braves || 1–2 || Allen || Jacobs (6–10) || — || — || 65–85
|- bgcolor="ffbbbb"
| 154 || September 27 || @ Braves || 0–1 || Tyler || Cooper (12–10) || — || — || 65–86
|- bgcolor="ffbbbb"
| 155 || September 30 || Reds || 4–5 || Mitchell || Mamaux (21–15) || — || — || 65–87
|-

|- bgcolor="ffbbbb"
| 157 || October 1 || @ Reds || 0–4 || Toney || Cooper (12–11) || — || — || 65–89
|-

|-
| Legend:       = Win       = Loss       = TieBold = Pirates team member

Opening Day lineup

Roster

Player stats

Batting

Starters by position 
Note: Pos = Position; G = Games played; AB = At bats; H = Hits; Avg. = Batting average; HR = Home runs; RBI = Runs batted in

Other batters 
Note: G = Games played; AB = At bats; H = Hits; Avg. = Batting average; HR = Home runs; RBI = Runs batted in

Pitching

Starting pitchers 
Note: G = Games pitched; IP = Innings pitched; W = Wins; L = Losses; ERA = Earned run average; SO = Strikeouts

Other pitchers 
Note: G = Games pitched; IP = Innings pitched; W = Wins; L = Losses; ERA = Earned run average; SO = Strikeouts

Relief pitchers 
Note: G = Games pitched; W = Wins; L = Losses; SV = Saves; ERA = Earned run average; SO = Strikeouts

References 

 1916 Pittsburgh Pirates team page at Baseball Reference
 1916 Pittsburgh Pirates Page at Baseball Almanac

Pittsburgh Pirates seasons
Pittsburgh Pirates season
Pitts